"Tanzverbot (Schill to Hell)" (dancing ban) is a song by the German hip-hop group Fettes Brot and rock musician Bela B. It was written to protest against the then-Hamburg Senator of the Interior Ronald Schill. The whole revenue for the sales of this single went to organisations, unions and facilities that suffered under the measures by the Senate of Hamburg.

In the middle of the song, Chris Isaak's "Wicked Game" is covered.

Fettes Brot and Bela B. later collaborated on "Fussball ist immer noch wichtig".

Track listing
 "Tanzverbot (Schill to Hell)"
 "Tanzverbot (Schill to Hell)" instrumental

References

2003 singles
Bela B. songs
Songs written by Bela B.
2003 songs